Yumare is a town and the seat of the Manuel Monge Municipality in the state of Yaracuy, Venezuela.

References

Cities in Yaracuy